Jorge José Ibarra Sánchez (born August 29, 1988, in Guadalajara, Jalisco, Mexico) is a Mexican  footballer who last played as a midfielder for Venados of Ascenso MX.

Biography
Jorge Ibarra was a promising player that came from the youth squads of Querétaro.

Honours
Lobos BUAP
 Ascenso MX: Clausura 2017
 Campeón de Ascenso: 2016-17

References

External links
 
 
 

1988 births
Living people
Footballers from Guadalajara, Jalisco
Querétaro F.C. footballers
Irapuato F.C. footballers
Lobos BUAP footballers
Altamira F.C. players
Dorados de Sinaloa footballers
Venados F.C. players
Liga MX players
Ascenso MX players
Mexican footballers
Association football midfielders